Balleri is an Italian surname. Notable people with the surname include:

Costanzo Balleri (born 1933), Italian footballer and coach
David Balleri (born 1969), Italian footballer, son of Costanzo
Mario Balleri (1902–1962), Italian rower

See also
Belleri

Italian-language surnames